American standup up comedian, actor, writer, and director Louis C.K. has received numerous awards for his work on Saturday Night Live, Louie (2010-2015), and Horace and Pete (2016). He also executive produced Baskets, and Better Things. He starred in critically acclaimed films such as Woody Allen's Blue Jasmine, David O. Russell's American Hustle (both 2013), and Jay Roach's Trumbo (2015). In 1999, C.K. received his first Primetime Emmy Award for his work as a writer on The Chris Rock Show. He went on to win 5 more Emmy awards for his work on his show Louie and his standup specials. He received three Grammy Awards for his comedy albums, Hilarious in 2011, Live at Madison Square Garden in 2015, and Sincerely Louis CK in 2020. For his work performing stand-up, writing, acting, directing, producing and editing, C.K. has received several awards and nominations. Among them are 39 Emmy Award nominations, with six wins.

Major Awards

Primetime Emmy Awards

Grammy Awards

Golden Globe Awards

Peabody Award

Guild awards

Directors Guild of America

Producers Guild of America

Screen Actors Guild

Writers Guild of America

Other Awards

Gotham Awards

Critics Choice Movie Awards

Critics Choice Television Awards

Television Critics Association

American Film Institute

American Comedy Awards

Satellite Awards

Film Festival Awards

Film Critics Awards

References 

C.K., Louis